Shushashoner Jonno Nagorik (translation: Citizens for Good Governance) (SHUJAN) is an organization in Bangladesh. The word SHUJAN, is a Bengali word. It came from an sentence "Shushanar Janniya Nagorik – SHUJAN". The headquarter of this organization located in Mohammadpur, Dhaka.

History 
SHUJAN was founded in 2002. Badiul Alam Majumdar is the founding secretary of Shujan.

In October 2022, Shujan said that it would be not possible for a political government in Bangladesh to hold a fair election using the by-elections from Gaibandha-5 as an example. Badiul Alam Majumdar denied allegations by the chief election commission, KM Nurul Huda, that he criticised the Election Commission after failing to get a job from the commission.

Goals and objectives 
SHUJAN's goals and objectives are to create a good government around the country. It focuses mainly for creating a democratic country. Often, they arrange some meetings, press conference for gaining their goals and drawing attention. They try to show the lacking of election system in the country. And also they give suggestions to election commission or authority for creating a pure democratic country. Not only SHUJAN tries to create good government but also it tries to solve social issues. They often work with other organizations.

Structure 
There are four parts of SHUJAN. They are central, district, upazila and union. Central committee plays an important role by taking decisions, work plan and future initiatives. The Current secretary of SHUJAN is Badiul Alam Majumdar. Current central coordinator of this organization is Dilip Kumar Sharkar.

Governing body

References 

2002 establishments in Bangladesh
Organisations based in Dhaka
Non-profit organisations based in Bangladesh
Political organisations based in Bangladesh